Callum Morris (born 3 February 1990) is a professional footballer who plays as a centre-back for Morpeth Town. Released by Newcastle United as a youngster, Morris played for Blyth Spartans then went to the Glenn Hoddle Academy in Spain, where he also played for Jerez Industrial. Returning to England, he joined Hayes & Yeading United before moving to Scotland in 2012, initially with Dunfermline Athletic before joining Dundee United in 2014. Morris moved to Aberdeen in the summer 2016, but did not play for the club. Morris returned to Dunfermline in December 2016, then moved to Ross County in June 2018. Morris returned to England in 2021 with Morpeth Town.

Born in England, Morris is of Irish descent and received his first call up to the Northern Ireland squad in 2016, having previously played for the Republic of Ireland under-21 team.

Club career

Early career 
Morris started his career as a youth player with Premier League side Newcastle United. He was given a twelve-month extension to his scholarship in 2008. While with Newcastle United reserves, Morris and teammate Darren Lough were described by coach Adam Sadler as "the next big thing", but he was released by the club in 2010, having never featured in the first team.

Following his release from Newcastle, Morris had an unsuccessful trial with Gateshead, before joining Blyth Spartans on 13 August 2010. After making five appearances for Blyth, Morris left the club to join the Glenn Hoddle Academy in Spain.

While at the Glenn Hoddle Academy, Morris also played for Spanish Fourth Division side Jerez Industrial CF, where he gained full-time, senior football experience. In November 2011, Morris joined Hayes & Yeading United, making three appearances for the club before being released in January 2012.

Dunfermline Athletic 
Following unsuccessful trials in England, Portugal and Greece, Morris had considered giving up professional football before signing for Dunfermline Athletic in the Scottish First Division on 31 August 2012. He made his debut for the club in a 3–1 win against Raith Rovers and went on to be a first team regular. On 8 December 2012, he received a straight red card after a foul on Stefan Scougall, in a 2–1 loss against Livingston. On his return on 29 December 2012, Morris scored his first goal, in a 4–2 loss against Morton. His second goal was also against Morton on 23 February 2013, when Dunfermline Athletic lost 4–1.

The season was marked with financial problems, which led to the club entering administration. Morris wrote on Twitter of his frustrations over wage delays. The club were relegated following a defeat in the play-offs, where Morris was absent for all four matches due to a hamstring injury. Despite relegation, he was named in the PFA Scotland Team of the Year for the First Division. He was also named the club's player of the season.

In his second season at Dunfermline Athletic, Morris rejected rumours that he had left the club by appearing in the opening friendly against Hearts. In his first competitive appearance of the season, Morris scored the club's first goal in League One, as the club lost 3–2 against Arbroath. As the season progressed, Morris continued to be a regular in the first team until mid-December when he suffered an Achilles tendon injury. After returning to the first team, Morris was offered a new contract with the club. His rejection of the offer led to interest from Dundee United.

Morris helped Dunfermline to finish second in League One, qualifying for the Championship play-offs and then winning against Stranraer on aggregate. The club remained in League One after losing 4–1 on aggregate to Cowdenbeath in the play-off final, in which Morris made his final appearance for the club.

Dundee United 
Morris signed a two-year contract with Scottish Premiership side Dundee United on 17 June 2014. He made his debut on 10 August 2014, as Dundee United beat Aberdeen 3–0 in the opening game of the season. His first goal for the club came on 21 September 2014, as Dundee United won 4–1 against city rivals Dundee in the Dundee derby. Having established himself in central defence alongside Jarosław Fojut, Morris soon suffered an Achilles injury during a match against St Johnstone which kept him out for several weeks. Morris made his return to the first team on 24 January 2015 in a 3–1 win over Motherwell. He scored in the next game, in the semi-final of the Scottish League Cup, which saw Dundee United beat Aberdeen 2–1 to send them through to the final. Morris then injured his knee, but recovered in time to start in the League Cup Final as Dundee United lost 2–0 to Celtic. Morris sustained a hamstring injury which kept him out for three weeks, then made his return to the first team and played six matches before suffering another injury, ruling him out for the rest of the season. Despite his injuries, Morris made 30 appearances and scored twice in all competitions.

Aberdeen 
Morris signed a one-year contract with Scottish Premiership side Aberdeen in June 2016. He made no appearances for the side, and was released on 30 December 2016.

Dunfermline return 
After leaving Aberdeen, Morris re-signed for Dunfermline Athletic on 31 December 2016 on a deal until the end of the 2016–17 season. After helping the club finish fifth in the Scottish Championship, Morris signed a one-year contract extension keeping him at the club until May 2018.

Prior to the start of the 2017–18 season, Morris was named captain of the club, following the departures of Andy Geggan and Callum Fordyce. Morris spent the season with the Pars before leaving at the end of his contract in May 2018.

Ross County
Morris signed for Ross County during the 2018 close season. In his first season at the club Morris won the 2018-19 Scottish Championship and the 2018-19 Scottish Challenge Cup. Morris was released by County on 27 May 2021 along with nine other players.

Morpeth Town
On 19 July 2021 Morris signed for Northern Premier League side Morpeth Town.

International career
Although born in England, Morris has Irish ancestry through both his parents, his mother's family originating from Waterford and his father's from Belfast. He initially chose to represent the Republic of Ireland, and played for their under-19 and under-21 teams before deciding to switch his allegiance to Northern Ireland. On 31 August 2016, Morris was called up for the first time to the Northern Ireland squad for the World Cup qualifying game against the Czech Republic.

Career statistics

Honours
Ross County
Scottish Championship: 2018–19
Scottish Challenge Cup: 2018–19

References

External links

1990 births
Living people
Republic of Ireland association footballers
Republic of Ireland youth international footballers
Republic of Ireland under-21 international footballers
English footballers
English people of Irish descent
English people of Northern Ireland descent
Newcastle United F.C. players
Blyth Spartans A.F.C. players
Jerez Industrial CF players
Hayes & Yeading United F.C. players
Dunfermline Athletic F.C. players
Dundee United F.C. players
Scottish Football League players
Scottish Professional Football League players
English expatriate sportspeople in Spain
Expatriate footballers in Spain
Morpeth Town A.F.C. players
Aberdeen F.C. players
Ross County F.C. players
Association football defenders